The Microregion of Catanduva is located on the north of São Paulo state, Brazil, and is made up of 13 municipalities. It belongs to the Mesoregion of São José do Rio Preto.

The microregion has a population of 221,465 inhabitants, in an area of 2,283.6 km²

Municipalities 
The microregion consists of the following municipalities, listed below with their 2010 Census populations (IBGE/2010):

Ariranha: 8,547
Cajobi: 9,768
Catanduva: 112,820
Catiguá: 7,127
Elisiário: 3,120
Embaúba: 2,423
Novais: 4,592
Palmares Paulista: 10,934
Paraíso: 5,898
Pindorama: 15,039
Santa Adélia: 14,333
Severínia: 15,501
Tabapuã: 11,363

References

Catanduva